Fred Siegel (born 1945) is a senior fellow at the Manhattan Institute for Policy Research, a conservative think tank which focuses on urban policy and politics. He also serves as a professor of history and the humanities at Cooper Union and is a contributor to numerous publications, including The New York Post (where he has a weekly column), The New Republic, The Atlantic Monthly, Commonweal, Tikkun, and Telos.

In the past he has served as the political advisor to several political candidates in New York City, including former Mayor Rudolph Giuliani. He is the author of several books, including The Prince of the City: Giuliani, New York, and the Genius of American Life and The Future Once Happened Here: New York, D.C., L.A., and the Fate of America's Big Cities.

He is the father of writer and editor Harry Siegel.

Selected publications
 “Is Archie Bunker Fit to Rule? Or: How Immanuel Kant Became One of the Founding Fathers”.  Telos 69 (Fall 1986). New York: Telos Press.
 “The Godfather of American Liberalism”.  City-Journal  (Summer 2009). New York: City Journal (New York).
 
 

References

External links
Cooper Union Faculty Page Professional Biography
The Progressive Policy Institute Brief professional biography.
City Journal Archive of Fred Siegel essays.
Q&A on Fred Siegel & Rudy Giuliani on National Review Online Interview with NRO editors.
CitiesonaHill.org Blog on Urban Affairs co-written by Fred and Harry Siegel.
Contentions: Blog Posts by Siegel for Commentary Magazine.
Manhattan Institute:  Siegel's writings.
 The Huffington Post: Siegel's writings.
PBS Interview of Siegel in 2002 about the New York Governor's race and education spending
Brookings Institution Transcript of "Governing Gotham", a discussion on Giuliani's legacy with Siegel, David Brooks (journalist), and Michael Tomasky.
An Ex-Liberal Reluctantly Supports Trump, The Wall Street Journal''

American male writers
Living people
Cooper Union faculty
Manhattan Institute for Policy Research
Year of birth missing (living people)